The following is the qualification system and qualified countries for the artistic swimming at the 2019 Pan American Games scheduled to be held in Lima, Peru.

Qualification system
A total of 80 artistic swimmers will qualify to compete at the games. As host nation, Peru qualifies the maximum team size of nine athletes (eight athletes + a reserve). Seven other teams will qualify (each with nine athletes). Each team will also be required to compete in the duet event with athletes already qualified for the team event. A further four countries will qualify a duet only.

Canada and the United States, as being the only members located in zone 4 and zone 3 respectively, automatically qualify a full team. The South American region and the Central American and Caribbean region will qualify three teams and five duets each. Therefore, a total of eight teams and twelve duets will qualify.

Qualification timeline

Qualification summary
A total of 12 NOC's qualified athletes.

Team

Duet

References

P
Qualification for the 2019 Pan American Games
Artistic swimming at the 2019 Pan American Games